Lakshman may refer to:
 Lakshman (name), a common Indian given name (including a list of persons with the name)
 Lakshmana, the character from the Ramayana 
 Laxman Kumara, the character from the Mahabharata
 Lakshmana (film)

See also
 Lakshmanaa, the character from the Mahabharata
 Lakshmana rekha